The following outline is provided as an overview of and topical guide to El Salvador:

El Salvador – sovereign country located on the Pacific Coast of Central America.  The area was originally called by the Pipil "Cuzhcatl", in Spanish "Cuzcatlan", which in Nahuatl means "The Land Of Precious Things".  After the Spanish conquest, the land was baptized by Spanish conquistadors as "Provincia De Nuestro Señor Jesucristo El Salvador Del Mundo" ("Province of Our Lord Jesus Christ, The Savior Of The World"), now abbreviated as "República de El Salvador". The country borders the Pacific Ocean between Guatemala and Honduras. With a population of approximately 5.8 million people, it is the most densely populated nation in Central America and is undergoing rapid industrialization.

General reference

 Pronunciation: 
 Common English country name: El Salvador
 Official English country name: The Republic of El Salvador
 Common endonym(s):  
 Official endonym(s):  
 Adjectival(s): Salvadoran
 Demonym(s):
 Etymology: In the early sixteenth century, Spanish conquistadors named this region "Provincia De Nuestro Señor Jesus Cristo, El Salvador Del Mundo" ("Province Of Our Lord Jesus Christ, The Savior Of The World"), which was subsequently abbreviated to "El Salvador".
 International rankings of El Salvador
 ISO country codes: SV, SLV, 222
 ISO region codes: See ISO 3166-2:SV
 Internet country code top-level domain: .sv

Geography of El Salvador 

 El Salvador is: a country
 Location:
 Northern Hemisphere and Western Hemisphere
 Americas
 North America
 Middle America
 Central America
 Latin America
 Time zone:  Central Standard Time (UTC-06)
 Extreme points of El Salvador
 High:  Cerro El Pital 
 Low:  North Pacific Ocean 0 m
 Land boundaries:  545 km
 342 km
 203 km
 Coastline:  North Pacific Ocean 307 km
 Population of El Salvador: 6,857,000  - 98th most populous country

 Area of El Salvador: 21,040 km2
 Atlas of El Salvador

Environment of El Salvador 

 Climate of El Salvador
 Wildlife of El Salvador
 Fauna of El Salvador
 Birds of El Salvador
 Mammals of El Salvador

Natural geographic features of El Salvador 

 Islands of El Salvador
 Mountains of El Salvador
 Volcanoes in El Salvador
 Rivers of El Salvador
 World Heritage Sites in El Salvador

Regions of El Salvador

Administrative divisions of El Salvador

Departments of El Salvador 

El Salvador is divided into 14 Departments.  Their names, abbreviations, (and capitals) are:

 AH    Ahuachapán    (Ahuachapán)
 CA    Cabañas    (Sensuntepeque)
 CH    Chalatenango    (Chalatenango)
 CU    Cuscatlán    (Cojutepeque)
 LI    La Libertad    (Santa Tecla)
 PA    La Paz    (Zacatecoluca)
 UN    La Unión    (La Unión)
 MO    Morazán    (San Francisco Gotera)
 SM    San Miguel    (San Miguel)
 SS    San Salvador    (San Salvador)
 SV    San Vicente    (San Vicente)
 SA    Santa Ana    (Santa Ana)
 SO    Sonsonate    (Sonsonate)
 US    Usulután    (Usulután)

Municipalities of El Salvador 

Municipalities of El Salvador
 Capital of El Salvador: San Salvador
 Cities of El Salvador

Demography of El Salvador 

Demographics of El Salvador

Government and politics of El Salvador 

Politics of El Salvador
 Form of government: presidential representative democratic republic
 Capital of El Salvador: San Salvador
 Elections in El Salvador
 Political parties in El Salvador

Branches of the government of El Salvador 

Government of El Salvador

Executive branch of the government of El Salvador 
 Head of state: President of El Salvador, Nayib Bukele
 Head of government: President of El Salvador, Nayib Bukele
 Cabinet of El Salvador

Legislative branch of the government of El Salvador 

 Legislative Assembly of El Salvador (unicameral)

Judicial branch of the government of El Salvador 

Court system of El Salvador
 Supreme Court of El Salvador

Foreign relations of El Salvador 

Foreign relations of El Salvador
 Diplomatic missions in El Salvador
 Diplomatic missions of El Salvador

International organization membership 
The Republic of El Salvador is a member of:

Agency for the Prohibition of Nuclear Weapons in Latin America and the Caribbean (OPANAL)
Central American Bank for Economic Integration (BCIE)
Central American Common Market (CACM)
Central American Integration System (SICA)
Food and Agriculture Organization (FAO)
Group of 77 (G77)
Inter-American Development Bank (IADB)
International Atomic Energy Agency (IAEA)
International Bank for Reconstruction and Development (IBRD)
International Chamber of Commerce (ICC)
International Civil Aviation Organization (ICAO)
International Criminal Police Organization (Interpol)
International Development Association (IDA)
International Federation of Red Cross and Red Crescent Societies (IFRCS)
International Finance Corporation (IFC)
International Fund for Agricultural Development (IFAD)
International Labour Organization (ILO)
International Maritime Organization (IMO)
International Monetary Fund (IMF)
International Olympic Committee (IOC)
International Organization for Migration (IOM)
International Organization for Standardization (ISO) (correspondent)
International Red Cross and Red Crescent Movement (ICRM)
International Telecommunication Union (ITU)
International Telecommunications Satellite Organization (ITSO)
International Trade Union Confederation (ITUC)

Inter-Parliamentary Union (IPU)
Multilateral Investment Guarantee Agency (MIGA)
Nonaligned Movement (NAM) (observer)
Organisation for the Prohibition of Chemical Weapons (OPCW)
Organization of American States (OAS)
Permanent Court of Arbitration (PCA)
Rio Group (RG)
Unión Latina
United Nations (UN)
United Nations Conference on Trade and Development (UNCTAD)
United Nations Educational, Scientific, and Cultural Organization (UNESCO)
United Nations Industrial Development Organization (UNIDO)
United Nations Interim Force in Lebanon (UNIFIL)
United Nations Mission for the Referendum in Western Sahara (MINURSO)
United Nations Mission in Liberia (UNMIL)
United Nations Mission in the Sudan (UNMIS)
United Nations Operation in Cote d'Ivoire (UNOCI)
Universal Postal Union (UPU)
World Confederation of Labour (WCL)
World Customs Organization (WCO)
World Federation of Trade Unions (WFTU)
World Health Organization (WHO)
World Intellectual Property Organization (WIPO)
World Meteorological Organization (WMO)
World Tourism Organization (UNWTO)
World Trade Organization (WTO)

Law and order in El Salvador 
 Constitution of El Salvador
 Crime in El Salvador
 Illegal drug trade in El Salvador
 Human rights in El Salvador (see :Category:Human rights in El Salvador
 Abortion in El Salvador
 LGBT rights in El Salvador
 Law enforcement in El Salvador

Military of El Salvador 

Military of El Salvador
 Command
 Commander-in-chief:
 Armed Forces of El Salvador
 Army of El Salvador
 Navy of El Salvador
 Air Force of El Salvador

History of El Salvador 

History of El Salvador

Culture of El Salvador 

Culture of El Salvador
 Cuisine of El Salvador
 Languages of El Salvador
 National symbols of El Salvador
 Coat of arms of El Salvador
 Flag of El Salvador
 National anthem of El Salvador
 Prostitution in El Salvador
 Religion in El Salvador
 Buddhism in El Salvador
 Christianity in El Salvador
 Islam in El Salvador
 Judaism in El Salvador
 World Heritage Sites in El Salvador

Art in El Salvador 
 Literature of El Salvador
 Music of El Salvador

Sports in El Salvador

Specific sports 
 Baseball in El Salvador
 El Salvador national baseball team
 Cricket in El Salvador
 El Salvador national cricket team
 Football in El Salvador
 El Salvador national beach soccer team
 El Salvador national football team
 El Salvador national football team season 2009
 El Salvador national football team season 2010
 El Salvador national football team season 2011
 El Salvador national football team season 2012
 El Salvador national football team season 2013
 El Salvador national football team kit
 El Salvador national under-17 football team
 El Salvador national under-20 football team
 El Salvador national under-21 football team
 El Salvador national under-23 football team
 El Salvador women's national football team
Rugby League in El Salvador
El Salvador national rugby league team
 Rugby Union in El Salvador
 El Salvador national rugby union team

General sports competitions 
 El Salvador at the Olympics
 El Salvador at the 1968 Summer Olympics
 El Salvador at the 1972 Summer Olympics
 El Salvador at the 1984 Summer Olympics
 El Salvador at the 1988 Summer Olympics
 El Salvador at the 1992 Summer Olympics
 El Salvador at the 1996 Summer Olympics
 El Salvador at the 2000 Summer Olympics
 El Salvador at the 2004 Summer Olympics
 El Salvador at the 2008 Summer Olympics
 El Salvador at the Pan American Games
 El Salvador at the 2003 Pan American Games
 El Salvador at the 2007 Pan American Games
 El Salvador at the 2011 Pan American Games
 El Salvador at the Paralympics
 El Salvador at the 2008 Summer Paralympics
 El Salvador at the 2006 FEI World Equestrian Games
 El Salvador at the 2009 World Championships in Athletics
 El Salvador at the 2010 Central American and Caribbean Games
 El Salvador at the 2010 Summer Youth Olympics

Economy and infrastructure of El Salvador 

Economy of El Salvador
 Economic rank, by nominal GDP (2007): 93rd (ninety-third)
 Agriculture in El Salvador
 Coffee production in El Salvador
 Banking in El Salvador
 Central Reserve Bank of El Salvador
 Communications in El Salvador
 Internet in El Salvador
 Internet in El Salvador
 Companies of El Salvador
 Energy in El Salvador
 Electricity sector in El Salvador
 Geothermal power in El Salvador
Currency of El Salvador: Dollar
ISO 4217: USD
 El Salvador Stock Exchange
 Transportation in El Salvador
 Airports in El Salvador
 Rail transport in El Salvador
 Water supply and sanitation in El Salvador

Education in El Salvador 

Education in El Salvador

See also

El Salvador

Index of El Salvador–related articles
List of El Salvador-related topics
List of international rankings
Member state of the United Nations
Outline of geography
Outline of North America

 1982 El Salvador earthquake
 January 2001 El Salvador earthquake
 February 2001 El Salvador earthquake
 2009 El Salvador floods and mudslides

References

External links

 
 

El Salvador